Blair McClenachan (1734May 8, 1812) was an Ireland-born American merchant and politician from Pennsylvania. He served one term in the United States House of Representatives from 1797 to 1799.  Previously, he served in the Pennsylvania House of Representatives.

Biography
McClenachan was born in the Kingdom of Ireland in 1734. He immigrated to the United States at an early age and settled in Philadelphia. He was described by Thomas Jefferson as a trader, banker, and shipowner.  During the American Revolutionary War he was one of the founders of and served with the First Troop Philadelphia City Cavalry. When the Continental Congress sought to raise money for the army in 1780, McClenachan and Robert Morris were the two highest subscribers to the effort.

He was a member of the Democratic-Republican Party. From 1790 to 1795, he was a member of the Pennsylvania House of Representatives.  In 1796, he defeated Robert Waln to win election to the 5th United States Congress from Pennsylvania's 2nd congressional district. He served only one term.

After his service in Congress, his businesses failed and a fraudulent transfer of his assets to his children resulted in McClenachan losing much of his fortune and led to his imprisonment for debt.  In 1802, he wrote to President Thomas Jefferson, seeking the position of Purveyor of Stores. Jefferson later appointed Tench Coxe to fill the position.

Personal life
McClenachan had six children. In 1781, his daughter, Deborah, married Colonel Walter Stewart, later Inspector General of the Continental Army and then Major General of the Pennsylvania Militia.

He died May 8, 1812, in Philadelphia; interment was in a vault in St. Paul's Cemetery.

References

 Retrieved on 2009-03-08
The Political Graveyard

External links

1734 births
1812 deaths
Irish emigrants to the United States (before 1923)
18th-century Irish people
Continental Army officers from Ireland
19th-century Irish people
Politicians from Philadelphia
Pennsylvania militiamen in the American Revolution
Members of the Pennsylvania House of Representatives
Kingdom of Ireland emigrants to the Thirteen Colonies
Democratic-Republican Party members of the United States House of Representatives from Pennsylvania